Flight of the Eagle is a 1967 novel by Swedish author Per Olof Sundman. It won the Nordic Council's Literature Prize in 1968.

References

1967 Swedish novels
Swedish-language novels
Nordic Council's Literature Prize-winning works
Fiction set in 1897
Novels set in the Arctic
Aviation novels
Novels set in the 1890s